Workers' International League may refer to:

Workers' International League (1937) British Trotskyist Group
Workers' International League (1985) British Trotskyist Group
Workers' International League - former name of the US Section of the International Marxist Tendency

See also the Workers Internationalist League and the International Workers League.

Political party disambiguation pages